Rafael Avelino Pereira Pinto Barbosa (born 29 March 1996) is a Portuguese professional footballer who plays as an attacking midfielder for C.D. Tondela.

Club career

Sporting CP
Born in Amarante, Porto District, Barbosa joined Sporting CP's youth academy at the age of 12. On 12 September 2015, he made his professional debut with the reserve team, playing 50 minutes in a 4–0 away win against Clube Oriental de Lisboa in the Segunda Liga. He scored his first goal in the competition a month later, helping the visitors defeat C.D. Santa Clara 3–2.

After half a season on loan at fellow league club C.F. União, Barbosa returned to Sporting B and netted eight times in 2017–18 from 34 appearances, in a final relegation to the third division. In the ensuing summer, he was loaned to Portimonense S.C. of the Primeira Liga.

Barbosa played his first match in the Portuguese top flight on 13 August 2018, coming on as a 73rd-minute substitute for Felipe Macedo in a 0–2 home loss to Boavista FC. On 30 September, during a game in the newly created under-23 league against S.L. Benfica, he was assaulted by the chairman of Portimonense's PLSC Rodiney Sampaio, initially pressing charges for the incident but sorting the situation out shortly after.

Tondela
On 18 August 2020, Barbosa signed a three-year contract with C.D. Tondela. On 23 October, he scored in a 1–0 home victory over Portimonense for his first ever goal in the top tier.

International career
Barbosa won his only cap for the Portuguese under-21 team on 5 September 2017, replacing Benfica's João Carvalho early into the second half of a 2–0 home defeat of Wales in the 2019 UEFA European Championship qualifiers.

Honours
Paços de Ferreira
Segunda Liga: 2018–19

References

External links

Portuguese League profile 

1996 births
Living people
People from Amarante, Portugal
Sportspeople from Porto District
Portuguese footballers
Association football midfielders
Primeira Liga players
Liga Portugal 2 players
Sporting CP B players
C.F. União players
Portimonense S.C. players
F.C. Paços de Ferreira players
G.D. Estoril Praia players
C.D. Tondela players
Portugal youth international footballers
Portugal under-21 international footballers